Hodgkinsonite is a rare zinc manganese silicate mineral Zn2MnSiO4(OH)2. It crystallizes in the monoclinic system and typically forms radiating to acicular prismatic crystals with variable color from pink, yellow-red to deep red.  Hodgkinsonite was discovered in 1913 by H. H. Hodgkinson, for whom it is named in Franklin, New Jersey, and it is only found in that area.

References

http://rruff.geo.arizona.edu/doclib/hom/hodgkinsonite.pdf Manual of Mineralogy
http://webmineral.com/data/Hodgkinsonite.shtml Webmineral
http://www.mindat.org/min-1913.html Mindat

External links

http://franklin-sterlinghill.com/palache/hodgkinsonite.stm

Nesosilicates
Geology of New Jersey
Monoclinic minerals
Minerals in space group 14